Bee Rock Tunnel is a former railroad tunnel that is located in Appalachia, Virginia. It was built in 1891 by the Louisville and Nashville Railroad. The tunnel is now part of the Bee Tunnel-Roaring Branch Trail.

References

External links
 2011 photo of Bee Rock Tunnel - the tunneldiaries.com
 Photo of a train approaching Bee Rock Tunnel - Virginia Tourism Corp.
 Old photo of Bee Rock Tunnel - Historical Society of Southwest Virginia (Rootsweb)

Railroad tunnels in Virginia
Buildings and structures in Wise County, Virginia
Louisville and Nashville Railroad
Rail trails in Virginia